The 1965–66 Connecticut Huskies men's basketball team represented the University of Connecticut in the 1965–66 collegiate men's basketball season. The Huskies completed the season with a 16–8 overall record. The Huskies were members of the Yankee Conference, where they ended the season with a 9–2 record. They were the Yankee Conference Regular Season Co-Champions. The Huskies played their home games at Hugh S. Greer Field House in Storrs, Connecticut, and were led by third-year head coach Fred Shabel.

Schedule 

|-
!colspan=12 style=""| Regular Season

Schedule Source:

References 

UConn Huskies men's basketball seasons
Connecticut
1965 in sports in Connecticut
1966 in sports in Connecticut